Santo Domingo Tepuxtepec  is a town and municipality in Oaxaca in south-western Mexico. The municipality covers an area of  km². 
It is part of the Sierra Mixe district within the Sierra Norte de Oaxaca Region.

As of 2015, the municipality had a total population of  4,815 inhabitants.

References

Municipalities of Oaxaca